Nils Nilsson may refer to:

 Nils Nilsson (art director) (1919–1981), Swedish film set designer
 Nils John Nilsson (1933–2019), artificial intelligence researcher
 Nils Nilsson (ice hockey) (1936–2017), Swedish ice hockey player and footballer
 Nils Nilsson (wrestler) (1899–1961), Swedish Olympic wrestler
 Nils Heribert-Nilsson (1883–1955), Swedish botanist and geneticist
 Nils Oskar Nilsson (1935–2018), Swedish politician of the Moderate Party